Mine Creek is a tributary of Crabtree Creek that rises in the northern Raleigh, North Carolina.  The creek then flows southwest to Shelley Lake and then south to Crabtree Creek.  The watershed is about 19% forested.

See also
List of rivers of North Carolina

References

External links
 Shelley Lake Park (City of Raleigh)
 Mine Creek Trail
 Geology of Mine Creek Trail

Rivers of North Carolina
Rivers of Wake County, North Carolina
Tributaries of Pamlico Sound